Blue and Sentimental is a song written by Count Basie, Jerry Livingston, and Mack David. It was written in 1938 and recorded by the Count Basie Orchestra on 6 June that year.

Other recordings
1947 - Count Basie recorded the song again on October 19, 1947 for RCA Victor Records (catalog No. 2602) with a vocal by Bob Bailey and it charted briefly in 1948.
1947 - The King Cole Trio recorded November 24, 1947.
1952 - The Mills Brothers (1952).
1958 - Michel Legrand recorded June 27, 1958, for his album Legrand Jazz, featuring Ben Webster on tenor saxophone. 
1962 - the song was featured on saxophonist Ike Quebec's album Blue & Sentimental
2001 - Tony Bennett and Kay Starr for the album Playin' with My Friends: Bennett Sings the Blues

References

1938 songs
Songs with lyrics by Mack David
Songs written by Jerry Livingston